Klossia is a genus of parasitic alveolates of the phylum Apicomplexa.

History

The genus was created by Schneider in 1875.

Taxonomy

The type species is Klossia helicina Schneider, 1875

Description

These species are generally found in molluscs.

Klossia alone among Coccidiidae has a distinct cell membrane.

The gamonts are spherical.

Host records

K. aphodii - Aphodius contaminatus, Aphodius fimetariusK. eberthi - Sepia speciesK. helicina - snail (Cepaea nemoralis)K. pachyleparon - monitor lizard (Varanus nebulosus'')

References

Apicomplexa genera